

OPNsense is an open source, FreeBSD-based firewall and routing software developed by Deciso, a company in the Netherlands that makes hardware and sells support packages for OPNsense. It is a fork of pfSense, which in turn was forked from m0n0wall built on FreeBSD. It was launched in January 2015.  When m0n0wall closed down in February 2015 its creator, Manuel Kasper, referred its developer community to OPNsense. 

OPNsense has a web-based interface and can be used on the x86-64 platform. Along with acting as a firewall, it has traffic shaping, load balancing, and virtual private network capabilities, and others can be added via plugins. OPNsense offers next-generation firewall capabilities utilizing Zenarmor, a NGFW plugin developed by OPNsense partner Sunny Valley Networks.

History 
In November 2017, a World Intellectual Property Organization panel found Netgate, the copyright holder of pfSense, used the domain opnsense.com in bad faith to discredit OPNsense, and obligated Netgate to transfer domain ownership to Deciso.

See also 
 Comparison of firewalls
 List of router and firewall distributions

References

Further reading 

Jack Wallen (18 April, 2019) "How to install the OPNsense Firewall/Router distribution". TechRepublic.

External links 
 

2015 software
BSD software
Firewall software
Free routing software
FreeBSD
Gateway/routing/firewall distribution
Operating system distributions bootable from read-only media
Products introduced in 2015
Routers (computing)
Wireless access points
Free software
Open-source movement